Poecilobothrus is a genus of flies in the family Dolichopodidae.

Species
Poecilobothrus aberrans (Loew, 1871)
Poecilobothrus annulitarsis Kazerani, Pollet & Khaghaninia in Kazerani, Khaghaninia, Talebi, Persson & Pollet, 2017
Poecilobothrus appendiculatus (Loew, 1859)
Poecilobothrus armeniorum (Stackelberg, 1933)
Poecilobothrus basilicus (Loew, 1869)
Poecilobothrus bigoti Mik, 1883
Poecilobothrus brunus (Wei, 1997)
Poecilobothrus caucasicus (Stackelberg, 1933)
Poecilobothrus chrysozygos (Wiedemann, 1817)
Poecilobothrus clarus (Loew, 1871)
Poecilobothrus comitialis (Kowarz, 1867)
Poecilobothrus cucullus (Wei, 1997)
Poecilobothrus cyaneculus (Wei, 1997)
Poecilobothrus ducalis (Loew, 1857)
Poecilobothrus flaveolus (Negrobov & Chalaya, 1987)
Poecilobothrus flavifemoratus Grichanov & Tonguc, 2010
Poecilobothrus innotabilis Kazerani, Pollet & Khaghaninia in Kazerani, Khaghaninia, Talebi, Persson & Pollet, 2017
Poecilobothrus lii (Yang, 1996)
Poecilobothrus longipilosus (Yang & Saigusa, 2001)
Poecilobothrus lorestanicus Grichanov & Ahmadi, 2016
Poecilobothrus luchunensis (Yang & Saigusa, 2001)
†Poecilobothrus majesticus d'Assis-Fonseca, 1976
Poecilobothrus mentougouensis (Zhang, Yang & Grootaert, 2003)
Poecilobothrus nobilitatus (Linnaeus, 1767)
†Poecilobothrus penicillatus Meunier, 1907
Poecilobothrus palustris (Wei, 2006)
Poecilobothrus potanini (Stackelberg, 1933)
Poecilobothrus principalis (Loew, 1861)
Poecilobothrus pterostichoides (Stackelberg, 1934)
Poecilobothrus regalis (Meigen, 1824)
Poecilobothrus saetosus Yang & Saigusa, 2002
Poecilobothrus singularis (Yang & Saigusa, 2001)
Poecilobothrus varicoloris (Becker, 1917)
Poecilobothrus zhejiangensis (Yang, 1997)

Unrecognised species:
 Poecilobothrus fumipennis (Stannius, 1831)
 Poecilobothrus infuscatus (Stannius, 1831)

References

Dolichopodinae
Dolichopodidae genera
Taxa named by Josef Mik